Valerie is generally a feminine given name, derived directly from the French Valérie (a female-only name). 
Valéry or Valery is a masculine given name in parts of Europe (particularly in France and Russia), as well as a common surname in Francophone countries. Another, much rarer, French masculine form can be Valère.

Both feminine and masculine forms have derivatives in many European languages and are especially common in Russian and other Eastern European languages. However, the masculine form is not always a cognate of the feminine: it can have a distinct etymology.

Etymology

Romance
The name is generally of Romance origins. The Latin clan name, Valerius, is masculine and denotes strength, health or boldness. Valeria is simply the feminine form of this. Both masculine and feminine given names are derived via French into other languages.

In Catholic Europe, given names always related the individual to a saint, so the popularity of a name often reflected the importance of the cult of a saint. There were several important saints who bore the name and were widely venerated in the Middle Ages, as well as more locally in recent times. St Valerie of Limoges (French Sainte Valérie de Limoges) probably exercised the greatest influence in spreading the name. Her cult was practised on the very important Way of St James and, as a cephalophore, she became a favourite subject for the early modern ceramics industry.

The majority of the variant spellings are of recent, mainly 20th century, origin, with fashions often following the forms adopted in popular songs.

Germanic
The modern masculine given name Valéry is ambiguous. While generally a cognate of Valérie, it can also be development of, or synonym for, the name Walaric(us) (English Walric), which is of Germanic origin and signifies “foreign power”. A notable example is Walric, abbot of Leuconay. Both “Saint-Valery” [valri] and “Saint-Valéry” [valeri] are common elements in French place-names, often used optionally for the same place. The second form is a modern misspelling for ‘Saint-Valery’, that is to say St Walric.

Notable people
Valerie Amos, Baroness Amos (born 1954), British politician
Valerie Bertinelli, American actress
Valerie French, English actress
Valerie Violet French (1909-1997), English socialite
Valerie Harper, American actress
Valerie Hart (1934–2021), indigenous political leader
Valerie Jarrett, American businesswoman and lawyer
Valerie Leon, British actress
Valerie Lilley, Northern Irish actress
Valerie Morales, Puerto Rican singer-songwriter
Valerie Parashumti (born 1987), one of the perpetrators of the 2006 murder of Stacey Mitchell in Perth, Australia
Valerie Plame, former CIA officer 
Valerie Sayers, American author
Valerie Singleton, British TV and radio presenter
Valerie Solanas (1936–1988), author of feminist book SCUM Manifesto
Valerie Whipps, First Lady of Palau

Religion
 Valerie of Limoges, according to legend, an associate of St Martial, a cephalophoric martyr and an important subject of Limoges porcelain.
 Valeria of Milan, often known as St Valerie, venerated in Thibodaux, Louisiana
 Valeria, a Christian saint martyred with Anesius

Sports
Dame Valerie Adams, New Zealand Olympic Shotputter
Valerie French, American professional wrestler
Valérie Hénin
Valerie Sweeting, Canadian curler
Valerie Zimring, American rhythmic gymnast

Fictional characters
 Valerie, a character in Breath of Fire II
 Valerie, a character in the animated series Frisky Dingo
 Valerie, a character in Czechoslovak surrealist fantasy horror Valerie and Her Week of Wonders (1970 film)
 Valerie Barlow, a character in the British soap opera Coronation Street
 Valerie "Val" Bassett, a minor character on the TV show Will & Grace
 Valerie Birkhead, a character in the TV show Sabrina the Teenage Witch
 Valerie Brown (also known as "Valerie Smith"), a character in the Josie and the Pussycats franchise
 Valerie Frizzle, character from The Magic School Bus
 Valerie Gail, a character in the 1988 film Earth Girls Are Easy
 Valerie Gray, a ghost hunter in the cartoon series Danny Phantom
 Valerie Lewton, a character from the 2000 film Final Destination
 Valerie Malone, a character in TV series Beverly Hills 90210
 Valerie Page, a character from the graphic novel V for Vendetta, as well as V for Vendetta (film)
 Valerie Pitman, a character in TV series Doctors
 Valerie "Val" Tyler, a character from the TV series What I Like About You

Others
 List of Wikipedia articles beginning with "Valerie"

Given name Valérie
 Valérie Beauvais (born 1963), French politician
 Valérie Blass (born 1967), Canadian artist 
 Valérie Lacroute (born 1965), French politician
 Valérie Lang (1966–2013), French actress
 Valérie Létourneau, Professional MMA fighter
 Valérie Nadaud (born 1968), French race walker
 Valérie Kaprisky (born 1962), French actress
 Valérie Quennessen (1957–1989), French film actress

See also 
 Valerie (disambiguation)

 Valery (name)
 Valarie (name)
 Valeriu (given name)
 Valerius (name)

 Valeria (given name)
 Valerian (name)
 Valeriano (name)
 Valerianus (disambiguation)

 Valer (disambiguation)
 Valera (disambiguation)
 Valérien (disambiguation)

 
 

English feminine given names
French feminine given names
Irish feminine given names
Scottish feminine given names
German feminine given names
Dutch feminine given names
Norwegian feminine given names
Swedish feminine given names
Danish feminine given names
Icelandic feminine given names